Karen Mullan MLA (born 18 August 1976) is a Sinn Féin politician from Derry, Northern Ireland who served as a Member of the Legislative Assembly for the Foyle constituency in the Northern Ireland Assembly from June 2017 to 2021.

History
Mullan served as a community worker in Derry prior to her co-option by Sinn Féin. She was co-opted after Foyle MLA Elisha McCallion was elected to the House of Commons following the 2017 general election. She was 

Sinn Féin's northern Education Spokesperson in the Assembly.

She is a graduate of Ulster University with a degree in Community Development and is a former manager of Hillcrest Trust, a community centre in the Waterside area of Derry.

She played a key role in setting up a charity, Pink Ladies Cancer Support Group, which lobbied for the delivery of the North-West Cancer Centre at Altnagelvin Hospital in Derry.

She left the assembly with Martina Anderson on 13 September 2021 being replaced by Pádraig Delargy and Ciara Ferguson.

Controversy
Mullan is also a director of Waterside Neighbourhood Partnership, which is a community group based in Derry. The organisation was found guilty in 2017 of having unlawfully discriminated against a job applicant based on political opinion. The organisation was ordered to pay £11,000 to the applicant, who was the highest-scoring candidate in the interviews. Giving evidence at the tribunal, Mullan revealed during cross-examination that an interview panellist informed her that they "had been bullied" into giving a better score. The tribunal said Mullan's evidence "lacked credibility".

References

Living people
Sinn Féin MLAs
Northern Ireland MLAs 2017–2022
Female members of the Northern Ireland Assembly
Politicians from Derry (city)
1976 births